The Gymnasium Carolinum in Osnabrück, Germany, was founded in 804 by Charlemagne, king of the Franks. It is reputedly the oldest school in Germany and is also one of the oldest surviving schools in the world.

History

In 1632, the Gymnasium was elevated into a university by the Jesuits. However, Swedish troops captured Osnabrück the next year for the Protestant side in the Thirty Years' War, and the Academia Carolina Osnabrugensis was closed. There would not be a university in Osnabrück until the University of Osnabrück opened in 1974.

Twentieth century
In 1933 the boys' school of the Gymnasium Carolinum had twenty-two teachers, all of whom were Catholics and thirteen of whom had served in the First World War.  Only one had up to that point joined the Nazi party. Yet Nazi educational policy changed both the curriculum and the views of students. The number of schools hours devoted to physical exercise, history, and geography increased, while those involving foreign languages and religion decreased. In 1939 essays written by students at the school reflected the new policies and referred frequently to works by Hitler and other Nazi leaders.

Notable alumni

 Hubertus Brandenburg, emeritus  Roman Catholic Bishop of Stockholm.
 Karl Brandi, historian
 Michael F. Feldkamp, historian and journalist
 Joseph A. Hemann, educator, newspaper publisher, and banker.
 Adolf Lasson, philosophical writer.
Levin Schücking, novelist
 Rudolf Seiters, politician from the CDU (Christian Democratic Union) party and former Vice President of the German Bundestag.
 Ludwig Windthorst, politician and justice minister.
 Timotheus Fleer, cook and philosopher

See also
 List of Jesuit sites
 List of the oldest schools in the world

References

Further reading
 Julius Jaeger: Die Schola Carolina Osnabrugensis. Festschrift zur Elfhundertjahrfeier des Königlichen Gymnasiums Carolinum zu Osnabrück. Pillmeyer, Osnabrück 1904.
 Josef Vormoor: Verzeichnis der Abiturienten des Gymnasium Carolinum 1830-1954. Nolte, Osnabrück 1954.
 Klemens-August Recker: „… meinem Volke und meinem Herrgott dienen …“. Das Gymnasium Carolinum zwischen partieller Kontinuität und Resistenz in der NS-Zeit. Ein Beitrag zur Bildungsgeschichte der Stadt und des Bistums Osnabrück zwischen 1848 und 1945. Verein für Geschichte und Landeskunde von Osnabrück, Osnabrück 1989, (Osnabrücker Geschichtsquellen und Forschungen 29), (Osnabrück, Univ., Diss., 1989).
 Johannes Hesse: Carolinger 1938 bis 1947. Erinnerungen eines ehemaligen Schülers. Wenner, Osnabrück 1997, .
 Michael F. Feldkamp: Karl der Große und das Gymnasium Carolinum in Osnabrück. Begründung, Pflege und Wandel einer 1200jährigen Erinnerungskultur. In: Geschichte im Bistum Aachen 5, 1999/2000, S. 71–116.
 Rolf Unnerstall, Dr. Holger Mannigel (Hrsg.): Gymnasium Carolinum. 804–2004. Fromm, Osnabrück 2004, .

External links
 Gymnasium Carolinum school website

Gymnasiums in Germany
Schools in Lower Saxony
Buildings and structures in Osnabrück
Educational institutions established in the 9th century
Establishments in the Carolingian Empire
9th-century establishments in Germany
804 establishments